The John Chambers College of Business and Economics is the business school of West Virginia University, a state university located in Morgantown in the U.S. State of West Virginia. The college building is in the downtown campus of the university.  The college offers ten undergraduate Bachelor of Science in Business Administration (BSBA) programs and one Bachelor of Science in Economics program, seven master programs, and doctoral programs throughout its six departments.

History

The College of Business and Economics traces its origins to the late 1940s when it awarded business administration degrees under College of Arts and Sciences. The WVU College of Commerce was created by an order of the state higher education board in November, 1951, with the first students enrolled for the first semester of the 1952-53 academic year. In 1954, the college was accredited by the American Assembly of Collegiate Schools of Business.  In 1957 the Master of Science in Industrial Relations was the first master's degree program in the college. The first Ph.D. program was established in 1965 in economics. In 1971 the College of Commerce was renamed the College of Business and Economics. On November 9, 2018 the college was renamed the John Chambers College of Business and Economics, after the two-time WVU alumnus.

Academic programs
The college offers the following undergraduate, graduate, and doctoral programs:

Undergraduate programs
Accounting
Economics
Entrepreneurship & Innovation
Finance
General Business
Global Supply Chain Management
Hospitality and Tourism Management
Management
Management Information Systems
Marketing
Organizational Leadership

Graduate programs
The College of Business and Economics offers seven masters programs and one certificate program:
 MBA
 Executive MBA (online)
 MS-Business Data Analytics (BUDA; online)
 MS-Business Cybersecurity (CYBR; online)
 MS-Finance
 MS-Industrial Relations
 Master of Accountancy (MAcc) 
 Graduate Certificate in Forensic Accounting and Fraud Examination (FAFE)

In addition, the College of Business and Economics offers MBA Dual degrees:
 MBA plus Master of Science in Industrial Relations (2 years)
 MBA plus Master of Science in Finance (2 years)
 MBA plus Master of Science in Sport Management (2 years)
 MBA plus Juris Doctor (3 years)

Doctoral programs
The College of Business and Economics offers Ph.D. Economics and a Ph.D. in business administration programs with concentrations in accounting, finance, management, and marketing.

Student organizations
The B&E has several student organizations or clubs for students to participate in.  Examples include:

Accounting Club
American Marketing Association
 Alpha Kappa Psi
 Beta Alpha Psi
 Beta Gamma Sigma
 Business Ethics Club
 Delta Sigma Pi
 Entrepreneurship Club
 Hospitality Club
 Industrial Relations Student Association
 Management Information Systems Association (MISA)
 Society for Human Resource Management (SHRM)
 Thompson Economics Club
 WVU Finance Club

Experiential Learning and Centers
The college is committed to disseminating its research, expertise, and know-how to the region and to society at large. The college is home to the following centers. These centers include: 
 Encova Center for Innovation and Entrepreneurship
 Bureau of Business and Economic Research
 Business Learning Resource Center
 Bernie Wehrle Global Supply Chain Laboratory
 Center for Career Development
 Center for Chinese Business
 Center for Executive Education
 Center for Free Enterprise
 Forensic Business Studies
 Data Driven WV
 Stuart M. and Joyce N. Robbins Center for Global Business and Strategy
 Crime Scene Complex for FAFE Program

Rankings
The West Virginia University was ranked #241 in 2021 under the USNews. The Business school was unranked.

References

West Virginia University
Business schools in the United States
Educational institutions established in 1951
1951 establishments in West Virginia